The .350 Legend (9×43 mm), also called 350 LGND, is a SAAMI-standardized straight-walled intermediate rifle cartridge developed by Winchester Repeating Arms. The cartridge was designed for use in American states that have specific regulations for deer hunting with straight-walled centerfire cartridges. At the cartridge's introduction, Winchester claimed that the .350 Legend was the fastest production straight-walled hunting cartridge in the world, although some .444 Marlin and .458 Winchester Magnum loads are faster, and the .350 Legend would be surpassed in 2023 by the .360 Buckhammer.

Overview 
Because of its similarities to the .223 Remington and 5.56 mm NATO, the .350 Legend is suitable for use in AR-15 type semiautomatic rifles, and will fit in most standard AR-15 magazines without modification.

History

At the 2019 SHOT Show in Las Vegas, Nevada, the .350 Legend cartridge was introduced by Winchester Ammunition. The Sporting Arms and Ammunition Manufacturers' Institute (SAAMI), the U.S. firearms and ammunition industry's technical standards-setting organization, announced the acceptance of the new cartridge and chamber standard on January 31, 2019.

Design
The recoil is said to be less than a .243 Winchester.

The cartridge offers a flatter trajectory with less recoil and better terminal performance over current straight-wall cartridges while remaining compliant in most applicable states.

The .350 Legend cartridge is designed to cycle in a variety of firearm platforms, and has been shown to operate in bolt-action rifles like the Winchester XPR.

.350 Legend has no parent case. However, .350 Legend uses the same  nominal rim diameter as .223 Remington. The .350 Legend case is a new design that maximizes terminal performance while optimizing the ability to extract the cartridge from the chambers of a variety of firearms. The .350 Legend did not adapt a .223 Remington parent case in order to incorporate a slight body taper (for extraction), as well as additional shellcase length and case volume.

These bullets were designed specifically to maximize .350 Legend cartridge performance.

Technical Drawing

Usage
The .350 Legend cartridge is engineered for deer hunters requiring a modern straight-walled cartridge. It is capable of killing hogs, deer, and coyotes.

The ability to practice cheaply with low recoil, high velocity .35 caliber (9.1 mm) rounds legal for deer hunting opens the door for many new shooters whose recoil sensitivity precludes their use of cartridges such as .450 Bushmaster or 12 gauge slug guns.

State legislation 
.350 Legend also addresses a rapidly growing market segment known as "straight-wall-cartridge-compliant" deer-hunting states. A growing number of states that previously restricted deer hunting to limited-range slug guns or muzzleloading firearms are now allowing rifles chambered in straight-walled centerfire cartridges.

The .350 Legend was designed for deer hunting in states that have specific regulations requiring straight-walled cartridges for use on deer, such as Ohio, Iowa, Indiana public land, and the Southern Lower Peninsula region of Michigan. Illinois also allows straight-walled cartridges if used with a pistol or a single-shot rifle. The pistol must be a centerfire revolver or centerfire single-shot handgun of .30 caliber or larger with a minimum barrel length of 4 inches.  Single-shot rifles in those specified calibers became legal on January 1, 2023. 

The .350 Legend is only 0.355 in caliber, two thousandths of an inch too small to satisfy Ohio's Deer Hunting Regulations, so technically the .350 Legend may not be legal in Ohio. All .350 Legend cartridges have bullets that measure between .354 and .355 in diameter, and barrels chambered in .350 Legend have a bore that's only .355 in diameter. After Winchester designed the cartridge for .355 bullets rather than using .357 or .358 bullets that would comply with Ohio's hunting regulations, they claimed in their SAAMI submission that the .350 Legend is ".357 - 0.0030" in diameter.

The Indiana Department of Natural Resources (Indiana DNR) website lists most cartridges, both bottlenecked and straight-walled, of at least .243" (6.2 mm) bullet diameter as allowed on private land. It is a common misconception that Indiana is a "straight-wall state" for public land deer hunting. Many straight-wall cartridges are legal in Indiana, but they are not required, as some rounds with bottlenecked cases—wildcat rounds such as .358 Hoosier and .358 WSSM, as well as the commercial (though not SAAMI-standardized) .458 SOCOM—still meet the state requirements.

See also
List of rifle cartridges
6×45mm
.360 Buckhammer

References

External links
 Chris Eger, "SAAMI approves new .350 Legend", guns.com, retrieved 15 February 2019.
 Philip Massar, "First look: Winchester .350 Legend", americanhunter.org, retrieved 15 February 2019.
 Gary Zinn, "Compared: 6.5 Grendel, 6.8 SPC, .300 Blackout and .350 Legend", chuckhawks.com, retrieved 8 June 2019.

Pistol and rifle cartridges